Şaziye Erdoğan-Okur (born February 23,1992) is a Turkish weightlifter competing in the Women's −45 kg division. Okur is the current world record holder in the −44 kg division of youth category with 77 kg in the snatch, 92 kg in the clean & jerk events and 169 kg in total.

Career
She was born to a poor family in Ankara, where her father was a construction worker. Already at the age of 11, she started with weightlifting in the primary school in Keçiören, Ankara.

At the 2009 European Weightlifting Junior Championships held in Landskrona, Sweden, on 28 July, she broke four European youth records lifting 79.0 kg in snatch, 97.0 kg in clean&jerk and 172.0 and then 176.kg in total.

She is trained by Talat Ünlü, Mustafa Doğan, Erkan Kayır and Nurcihan Gönül.

In 2013, Okur was banned from international competition by the International Weightlifting Federation for 2 years for use of anabolic steroid Stanozolol.

She won the bronze medal in the women's 45kg event at the 2021 World Weightlifting Championships held in Tashkent, Uzbekistan.

She won the gold medal in the women's 45kg event at the 2022 European Weightlifting Championships held in Tirana, Albania. She won the bronze medal in the women's 49kg Snatch and Clean & Jerk events at the 2022 Mediterranean Games held in Oran, Algeria.

Major results

References

External links
 
 
 Saziye Okur at Weightlifting Database 

1992 births
Sportspeople from Ankara
Living people
Turkish female weightlifters
Doping cases in weightlifting
Competitors at the 2018 Mediterranean Games
Competitors at the 2022 Mediterranean Games
Mediterranean Games gold medalists for Turkey
Mediterranean Games bronze medalists for Turkey
Mediterranean Games medalists in weightlifting
World Weightlifting Championships medalists
European Weightlifting Championships medalists
Islamic Solidarity Games competitors for Turkey
Islamic Solidarity Games medalists in weightlifting
21st-century Turkish women